Boston's Old City Hall was home to its city council from 1865 to 1969. It was one of the first buildings in the French Second Empire style to be built in the United States. After the building's completion, the Second Empire style was used extensively elsewhere in Boston and for many public buildings in the United States, such as the Old Executive Office Building in Washington, D.C., as well as other city halls in Providence, Baltimore and Philadelphia. The building's architects were Gridley James Fox Bryant and Arthur Gilman.

History

Old City Hall, built between 1862 and 1865, is located at 45 School Street, along the Freedom Trail between the Old South Meeting House and King's Chapel. The Boston Latin School operated on the site from 1704 to 1748, and on the same street until 1844.

Also on the site, the Suffolk County Courthouse was erected in 1810 and converted to Boston's second city hall in 1841, being replaced by the current building twenty-four years later. Thirty-eight Boston mayors, including John F. Fitzgerald, Maurice J. Tobin, and James Michael Curley, served their terms of office on School Street at this site over a period of 128 years.

With the move to the current Boston City Hall in 1969, Old City Hall was converted over the next two years to serve other functions – an early and successful example of adaptive reuse. The Boston-based nonprofit developer Architectural Heritage Foundation, Inc. (now AHF Boston) and the architecture firm Finegold Alexander + Associates Inc completed the adaptive use and renovation. AHF Boston subsequently managed the property for fifty years.

It was listed on the National Register of Historic Places and was designated a U.S. National Historic Landmark in 1970.

Points of architectural interest 
The granite exterior characterized by ornamented columns, the mansard roof, and the projecting central bay
The massive front doors, unusual in the use of different wood, as well as the inlay of the marble circle in each door
The murals in the building entrances on School Street and Court Square illustrating the history of both the building and the site
The marble plaque in the first floor lobby commemorating the laying of the cornerstone in 1862 by Mayor Joseph Wightman and the dedication of the building in 1865 by Mayor Frederic W. Lincoln Jr.
The hopscotch in the School Street sidewalk recognizing this as the site of the Boston Latin School
The statues in the courtyard:
Benjamin Franklin, who attended school on this site. Scenes of Franklin's accomplishments appear in bas-relief on the square pedestal of the statue. The statue (1856) was the first portrait statue to be erected in Boston. Franklin is depicted as he would actually appear, rather than draped in toga, cloak, or classical attire. The statue was designed by Richard Saltonstall Greenough, as are two of the bas-reliefs.
Josiah Quincy III, Boston's second mayor; the statue (1879) was designed by Thomas Ball.
A donkey, signifying the Democratic Party, with two bronze footprints in front of it labeled "stand in opposition" and a plaque explaining the origin of the donkey as the party's symbol.

Old City Hall today
In 2017, Synergy Investments purchased Old City Hall for $30.1 million from AHF Boston.

Mayors who served in Old City Hall

 Frederic W. Lincoln Jr. (1863–1866)
 Otis Norcross (1867–1868)
 Nathaniel B. Shurtleff (1868–1871)
 William Gaston (1871–1872)
 Henry L. Pierce (1873)
 Leonard R. Cutter (1873)
 Samuel C. Cobb (1874–1876)
 Frederick O. Prince (1877)
 Henry L. Pierce (1878)
 Frederick O. Prince (1879–1881)
 Samuel A. Green (1882)
 Albert Palmer (1883)
 Augustus P. Martin (1884)
 Hugh O'Brien (1885–1888)
 Thomas N. Hart (1889–1890)
 Nathan Matthews Jr. (1891–1894)
 Edwin Upton Curtis (1895)
 Josiah Quincy (1896–1899)
 Thomas N. Hart (1900–1902)
 Patrick Collins (1902–1905)
 Daniel A. Whelton (1905–1906)
 John F. Fitzgerald (1906–1908, 1910–1914)
 George A. Hibbard (1908–1910)
 James M. Curley (1914–1918, 1922–1926, 1930–1934, 1946–1950)
 Andrew J. Peters (1918–1922)
 Malcolm Nichols (1926–1930)
 Frederick Mansfield (1934–1938)
 Maurice J. Tobin (1938–1945)
 John E. Kerrigan (1945–1946)
 John B. Hynes (1947, 1950–1960)
 John F. Collins (1960–1968)
 Kevin H. White (1968–1984)

Gallery

See also
 Boston City Council
 Boston City Hall – current city hall
 List of mayors of Boston
 Past Members of the Boston City Council
 List of National Historic Landmarks in Boston
 National Register of Historic Places listings in northern Boston, Massachusetts

References
Notes

Further reading
 Boston City Council. Memorial of the inauguration of the statue of Franklin. 1857.

External links

 Official site
 Library of Congress. Historic American Buildings Survey.

Government buildings in Boston
Landmarks in Financial District, Boston
National Historic Landmarks in Boston
Second Empire architecture in Massachusetts
Government buildings completed in 1865
Government of Boston
19th century in Boston
20th century in Boston
City and town halls on the National Register of Historic Places in Massachusetts
Former seats of local government
National Register of Historic Places in Boston